In mathematics, an essentially finite vector bundle is a particular type of vector bundle defined by Madhav V. Nori, as the main tool in the construction of the fundamental group scheme.  Even if the definition is not intuitive there is a nice characterization that makes essentially finite vector bundles quite natural objects to study in algebraic geometry. The following notion of finite vector bundle is due to André Weil and will be needed to define essentially finite vector bundles:

Finite vector bundles

For  an integral polynomial with nonnegative coefficients define

Definition
The following two definitions coincide whenever  is a reduced, connected and proper scheme over a perfect field.

According to Borne and Vistoli
A vector bundle is essentially finite if it is the kernel of a morphism  where  are finite vector bundles.

The original definition of Nori
A vector bundle is essentially finite if it is a subquotient of a finite vector bundle in the category of Nori-semistable vector bundles.

Properties
 Let  be a reduced and connected scheme over a perfect field  endowed with a section . , where ).

When  is a reduced, connected and proper scheme over a perfect field with a point  then the category  of essentially finite vector bundles provided with the usual tensor product , the trivial object  and the fiber functor  is a Tannakian category.

 The -affine group scheme  naturally associated to the Tannakian category  is called the fundamental group scheme.

Notes

Scheme theory
Topological methods of algebraic geometry